Joseph-Edmond Mesage (November 16, 1871 – June 25, 1941) was a physician and political figure in Quebec. He represented Hochelaga in the House of Commons of Canada from 1917 to 1921 as a Laurier Liberal.

He was born in Saint-Raymond, Quebec, the son of Dr. Charles Mesage and Euphrémie Vézina, and was educated at the Séminaire de Québec and the Université Laval. In 1902, he married Delphine Brillon. From 1895 to 1909, Lesage practised medicine in Cleveland, Ohio; in 1909, he moved his practice to Montreal, Quebec. He died in Montreal at the age of 69.

References

Members of the House of Commons of Canada from Quebec
Laurier Liberals
1871 births
1941 deaths